The Grant Whitney House, in Payette, Idaho, was built in 1890. It was listed on the National Register of Historic Places in 1978.

It is a brick house built in Queen Anne style, and was unusual within that style (and perhaps especially in Idaho) for incorporating a mansard roof.  Queen Anne features include its irregular massing and its turret topped by a conical roof.

A person named Walter Campbell is identified as its architect or builder.

The house no longer exists, at least not at that location, and there is no information available saying it was moved. It was located at 1015 7th Ave., N., in Payette.

Notes

References

National Register of Historic Places in Payette County, Idaho
Queen Anne architecture in Idaho
Second Empire architecture in Idaho
Houses completed in 1890